Clark Tibbitts (1903-1985) was a gerontologist who helped bring attention to the topic of aging and establish programs for aging populations in the United States. He held a variety of positions within gerontology and was an contributing author of many articles that examined aging. He has been described as "an architect of the field of gerontological education-an academic who spent most of his career in the federal government as an advocate for the development of aging education, training, and research programs in institutions of higher education."

Biography 
Tibbitts was born in 1903 and died at the age of 82 in October 1985. He graduated with a Bachelor of Science degree from the Lewis Institute in 1924 and did  graduate work at University of Chicago. He retired at age 83, after 35 years of government service.  He worked as deputy director of the Office of Aging 1960-66, director of training for the Administration of Aging 1966-74, director of the National Clearinghouse on Aging 1974-76, special assistant to the Commissioner on Aging 1976-1982, both that have roots from Tibbitts' original committee on aging.

Career 

Tibbitts was director of the institute for Human Adjustment at the University of Michigan for 12 years before moving to Washington D.C. in 1949. He then served as specialist for aging, before any agencies were dedicated to the aging population. He was the author of many articles and texts on gerontology and aging. He was an advocate for government resources for the aging population, at a time when  the average life expectancy in the United States was growing rapidly with assistance from advances in medicine and technology. He examined the social and psychological aspects of aging that had not been previously studied or explored because of the low life expectancy up until the mid twentieth century.

Accomplishments 
Tibbitts was notable for his efforts to plan, organize, and convene multiple international conferences on aging for more than three decades, until the 1980s. His work encompasses more than 100 publications, including his Handbook of Social Gerontology: Societal Aspects of Aging, which, for a decade, was the major used textbook on aging.

Awards 

 1957 - Honorary Sc. D. degree (a doctorate of science higher than a PhD), from the Institute of Divi Thomae in Cincinnati, Ohio.
 1981- AGHE award for his outstanding contribution to the study of gerontology.
 1986- The Clark Tibbitts Award was established in 1986 for his contributions in the development of The Association for Gerontology in Higher Education, replacing the award he won in 1981.

Selected publications 

 Tibbitts, Clark (1950, October). The conference on aging.
	 
 Tibbitts, C. (1967, March 11). History in the making

References 

American gerontologists
1903 births
1985 deaths
Social security in the United States
Illinois Institute of Technology alumni
University of Chicago alumni
University of Michigan people